Microdochium is a genus of ascomycete fungi, which contains several plant pathogens. The teleomorph is Monographella. The genus was circumscribed by German mycologist Hans Sydow in 1924.

Species
As accepted by GBIF;
 Microdochium albescens , as Monographella albescens
 Microdochium bolleyi 
 Microdochium caespitosum , affects leaves of Eucalyptus deglupta
 Microdochium chrysanthemoides 
 Microdochium citrinidiscum 
 Microdochium colombiense 
 Microdochium consociatum 
 Microdochium cylindricum , affects leaves of Eucalyptus camaldulensis
 Microdochium fisheri  Microdochium fusariisporum 
 Microdochium griseum , affects leaves of Eucalyptus sideroxylon  Microdochium intermedium 
 Microdochium linariae 
 Microdochium lycopodinum 
 Microdochium majus 
 Microdochium maydis 
 Microdochium nivale , as Monographella nivalis var. nivalis, Pink snow.
 Microdochium novae-zelandiae, 
 Microdochium opuntiae 
 Microdochium palmicola 
 Microdochium panattonianum 
 Microdochium paspali 
 Microdochium passiflorae 
 Microdochium phragmitis 
 Microdochium phyllanthi 
 Microdochium punctum 
 Microdochium queenslandicum 
 Microdochium rhopalostylidis 
 Microdochium sclerotiorum 
 Microdochium seminicola 
 Microdochium stevensonii 
 Microdochium stoveri 
 Microdochium tainanense 
 Microdochium trichocladiopsis 
 Microdochium triticicola 

Note Microdochium dimerum is now a synonym for Bisifusarium dimerum''

References

Sordariomycetes genera